Sanji (written: 三次 or さん治) is a masculine Japanese given name. Notable people with the name include:

, American politician
, stage name of Hirō Hase, Japanese voice actor
, Japanese cyclist
, Imperial Japanese Navy admiral

Fictional characters
Sanji (One Piece), a character in the manga series One Piece

Japanese masculine given names